Milo Bigler (October 2, 1914 – October 1989) was a Swiss skeleton racer who competed in the late 1940s. He finished 11th in the skeleton event at the 1948 Winter Olympics in St. Moritz.

References

External links
Skeletonsport.com results
Milo Bigler's profile at Sports Reference.com

1914 births
1989 deaths
Skeleton racers at the 1948 Winter Olympics
Swiss male skeleton racers
Olympic skeleton racers of Switzerland